Monica Isakstuen (born 19 October 1976) is a Norwegian writer from Fredrikstad. She made her literary debut in 2008 with the poetry collection Sånn, borte. In 2009 she released her first novel, Avstand, in 2011 the poetry collection Alltid nyheter, and in 2014 the novel Om igjen. She was awarded the Brage Prize for 2016, for her novel Vær snill med dyrene. In 2018 she released the play Se på meg når jeg snakker til deg. Her later novels are Rase (2018), and Mine venner (1921).

References

1976 births
Living people
Norwegian women novelists
Norwegian women poets
Norwegian dramatists and playwrights
21st-century Norwegian novelists
21st-century Norwegian women writers
People from Fredrikstad